EliteXC: Renegade was a mixed martial arts event promoted by EliteXC that took place on Saturday, November 10, 2007 at the American Bank Center in Corpus Christi, Texas.  The main card aired live on Showtime.

Background
The main event featured a showdown between Nick Diaz and K. J. Noons for the new EliteXC 160-pound Lightweight title.

The card also featured the EliteXC debut of Internet brawler Kevin "Kimbo Slice" Ferguson, as well as welterweight stand-out Jake Shields.

Results

See also
 Elite Xtreme Combat
 2007 in Elite Xtreme Combat

References

External links
Official EliteXC site
Official Showtime Networks, Inc. site

Renegade
2007 in mixed martial arts
Mixed martial arts in Texas
Sports in Corpus Christi, Texas
2007 in sports in Texas